Jämsänjoki is a river in Finland in the town of Jämsä in Central Finland region. The river flows from Kankarisvesi into the Lake Päijänne, from which the waters flows into the Gulf of Finland through the Kymijoki river.

See also
List of rivers of Finland

Rivers of Finland